Cafelândia may refer to:
Cafelândia, Paraná, municipality in the State of Paraná, Brazil
Cafelândia, São Paulo, municipality in the State of São Paulo, Brazil